Gastrotheca ovifera (vernacular names: pouched frog and giant marsupial frog;  or ) is a species of frog in the family Hemiphractidae. It is endemic to northern Venezuela and is known from the Venezuelan Coastal Range, including Sierra de Aroa.

It is associated with bromeliads where it hides, especially during dry periods. The eggs are carried on the female's back and have direct development (i.e., there is no free-living larval stage).

This species can be locally abundant, but it has declined in many places where it used to be common. It is threatened by habitat loss caused by agriculture, logging, and infrastructure development. However, it has also declined in protected areas such as the Henri Pittier National Park, for reasons that are unclear.

References

ovifera
Endemic fauna of Venezuela
Amphibians of Venezuela
Amphibians described in 1854
Taxa named by Hinrich Lichtenstein
Taxonomy articles created by Polbot